The Early Years contains the non-album singles Gasolin' released in 1970-73, with the exception of "Uh-Lu-La-Lu" which was released in 1978. Especially the first seven songs released in 1970-71 are interesting as they show a band looking for a musical identity. Still, you wonder why the record company did not finish the job by including all Gasolin' non-album singles and rare songs such as "Endelig jul igen" and "Dejlig er jorden".

Track listing 
 "Silky Sally" (Larsen/Beckerlee) - 4:33
 "I've Got To Find The Loser" (Larsen/Beckerlee) - 3:18
 "Child of Institution" (Larsen/Beckerlee) - 2:21
 "The Escape" (Jönsson/Beckerlee) - 0:50
 "W.J." (Jönsson/Beckerlee) - 1:15
 "Johnny The Jackpot" (Larsen/Jönsson/Beckerlee) - 3:32
 "Get In Touch With Tomorrow" (Larsen/Jönsson/Beckerlee) - 3:25
 "Holy Jean" (Larsen/Beckerlee) - 3:08
 "Lady Rain" (Larsen) - 3:07
 "Fed lykke til alle" (Gasolin'/Quist Møller) - 2:05
 "Uh-Lu-La-Lu" (Gasolin') - 2:43

Credits

Gasolin'

Kim Larsen - vocals, guitar
Wili Jønsson - bass, piano, vocals
Franz Beckerlee - lead guitar, vocals
Søren Berlev - drums, vocals

References

Early Years, The
2000 compilation albums
Columbia Records compilation albums